Birger Jensen (born 1 March 1951) is a Danish retired footballer who played as a goalkeeper.

He played professionally for Belgian team Club Brugge, with whom he reached the 1976 UEFA Cup Final and the 1978 European Cup Final and lost both to English side Liverpool. After his brilliant display in the final of the European Cup (1978), the international press called him the best goalkeeper in the world.
He played a total of 390 games for the Belgian side in all competitions and scored two goals. Jensen played 19 matches for the Denmark national football team from 1973 to 1979.

He started his career with Danish club B 1903, before moving abroad to play professionally with Club Brugge in 1974. With Club Brugge, he won five Belgian Jupiler League championships and two Belgian Cups, and reached the 1978 European Cup Final which was lost to English club Liverpool. He left Club Brugge in 1988, and went on to play for Belgian club Lierse SK and Dutch club RKC Waalwijk, before ending his career back in Belgium with amateur side FC Varsenare.

Honours

Player 
Club Brugge
Belgian First Division (5): 1975–76, 1976–77, 1977–78, 1979–80, 1987–88
Belgian Cup (2): 1976–77, 1985–86; 1978-79 (finalists), 1982-83 (finalists)
Belgian Supercup (2): 1980, 1986
UEFA Cup: 1975-76 (runners-up)
European Champion Clubs' Cup: 1977-78 (runners-up)
Jules Pappaert Cup (1): 1978
Bruges Matins (3): 1979, 1981, 1984
Japan Cup Kirin World Soccer (1): 1981

External links
Danish national team profile
Club Brugge profile 
ELFvoetbal profile

References 

1951 births
Living people
Footballers from Copenhagen
Association football goalkeepers
Danish men's footballers
Danish expatriate men's footballers
Club Brugge KV players
Lierse S.K. players
RKC Waalwijk players
Belgian Pro League players
Eredivisie players
Denmark international footballers
Expatriate footballers in Belgium
Expatriate footballers in the Netherlands
Danish expatriate sportspeople in the Netherlands
Danish expatriate sportspeople in Belgium